Kasonde is a surname. Notable people with the surname include:

Emmanuel Kasonde (1935–2008), Zambian economist and politician
Francis Kasonde (born 1986), Zambian football player
Joseph Kasonde (1938–2017), Zambian politician
Linda Kasonde (born 1978), Zambian legal practitioner